The Harry Potter Movie Magic Experience at Warner Bros. Movie World in Gold Coast, Queensland, Australia was a walk-through attraction which featured several recreations of sets from the Harry Potter movies. The original attraction opened on 26 December 2001, themed to the first movie while a second version opened one year later to coincide with the second movie. The Harry Potter Movie Magic Experience closed in 2003 and was replaced by The Official Matrix Exhibit.

History
The attraction launched within a month of the Australasian Premiere of Harry Potter and the Philosopher's Stone at Warner Bros. Movie World. In order to fully publicize their new attraction Movie World opened a Harry Potter Gift Shop on Main Street and had young staff members dressed as generic Hogwarts students walking around the park. These characters remained in Main Street until the closure of the exhibit in 2003.

The attraction was modified in mid-2002 to suit the second film, Harry Potter and the Chamber of Secrets. A few scenes slightly changed to suit the second instalment including the addition of a replica of Mr. Weasley's Flying Car.

Summary
Guests would queue at Platform 9 3/4 right alongside a recreation of the Hogwarts Express. The walk-through began by admitting small groups of guests into a small room with brick walls surrounding. Thanks to the magical expertise of the group's guide, the wall would magically slide away to reveal Diagon Alley. A similar scene appears in Harry Potter and the Philosopher's Stone. Guests were guided along Diagon Alley, with a quick stop at Ollivanders Wand Shop and into Harry's dormitory. Guests were then able to discover the art of sending an owl with a real-life owl display.

See also
 The Wizarding World of Harry Potter

References

External links
 Harry Potter Movie Magic Experience Photos at Parkz.

Amusement rides introduced in 2001
Amusement rides that closed in 2003
Movie Magic Experience
Warner Bros. Movie World
Former Warner Bros. Global Brands and Experiences attractions
2001 establishments in Australia
2003 disestablishments in Australia